Sammy Sampene (born 18 December 1942) is a Ghanaian former footballer. He competed in the men's tournament at the 1968 Summer Olympics.

References

External links
 
 

1942 births
Living people
Ghanaian footballers
Ghana international footballers
Olympic footballers of Ghana
Footballers at the 1968 Summer Olympics
1968 African Cup of Nations players
Footballers from Kumasi
Association football forwards
Asante Kotoko S.C. players